Thomas McGarry (25 November 1927 – 14 November 2002) was a Scottish professional footballer, who played as an inside forward for Dunfermline Athletic, Hamilton Academical, Dumbarton, Walsall and Dundee United.

References

1927 births
2002 deaths
Association football inside forwards
Dumbarton F.C. players
Dundee United F.C. players
Dunfermline Athletic F.C. players
English Football League players
Footballers from Glasgow
Hamilton Academical F.C. players
Scottish Football League players
Scottish footballers
Scottish Junior Football Association players
Vale of Clyde F.C. players
Walsall F.C. players